Jane Haskett Bock is a professor emerita in biology at the University of Colorado, Boulder.

Early life 
Jane H. Bock was born Jane Haskett. She intended to follow her mother’s footsteps as a chemist, but once in college, she decided to switch to botany. She received a bachelor's degree from Duke University, a master's degree from Indiana University Bloomington, and earned a PhD in Botany from the University of California at Berkeley in 1966. At the time, she was one of only three women in her department.

She has one daughter with husband and zoologist Carl E. Bock, where they were both directors of the "Research Ranch" in Arizona. Additionally, both taught at the University of Colorado in 1968.

Career 
In 1982 a medical examiner approached Jane and asked her to identify the food plants in the stomach of a murder victim. Jane created samples by chewing up food herself and comparing it to the contents of the victim’s stomach. Her work led the police to the killer, and she was regularly recruited to homicide investigations.

Impact 
She was also featured in an episode of Forensic Files in which she helped police catch a killer by identifying a strain of grass that was found at the crime scene, on the body, and on the suspect’s shoes. By proving that the grass from all the sources was identical, Jane helped police link the suspect to the crime and convict the murderer.

After their time at the "Research Ranch" in Arizona, Bock and her husband published a book in 2000 about their work called The View from Bald Hill.

She is also a significant member of the following groups:

Forensic Botany, LLC. Founding member.
American Academy of Forensic Sciences
Botanical Society of America
Society for International Conservation
Society for Conservation Biology
British Ecological Society
International Association for Identification
Necrosearch International, Ltd (Charter Member)

California Botanical Society

Awards & Certificates 
 2000 Outstanding Women of 1972 (British List)
 Hunt Botanical Library Listing
 Charles A. Lindbergh Fellow
 Hazel Barnes Prize for Research and Teaching, University of Colorado, Boulder Campus, 1997.
 Boulder Faculty Assembly Service Award, 1999
 Lesley Hewes Award for Best Paper - 1998-9.

Current life 
Bock is a professor emerita in biology at the University of Colorado, Boulder. She is currently retired, though still conducts research as a forensic botanist.

References

Year of birth missing (living people)
Living people
Duke University alumni
Indiana University Bloomington alumni
University of California, Berkeley alumni
21st-century American botanists